The 15th Battalion (48th Highlanders of Canada), CEF was an infantry battalion of the Canadian Expeditionary Force during the Great War. The 15th Battalion was authorized on 1 September 1914, embarked for Britain on 26 September 1914 and arrived in France on 15 February 1915. The battalion fought as part of the 3rd Canadian Brigade, 1st Canadian Division in France and Flanders throughout the war. The battalion was disbanded on 30 August 1920.

History 
The 15th Battalion recruited in Toronto, Sudbury, Owen Sound and St. Catharines, Ontario and Waterloo and Coaticook, Quebec and was mobilized at Camp Valcartier, Quebec.

The battalion fought on the southern flank of the 3rd Brigade during the attack on Vimy Ridge.  They met little resistance from the Germans and reached their objectives within a few hours.  The battalion suffered around 20% casualties with nine officers and over a hundred other ranks being killed or wounded.

Brock Chisholm served with this battalion during the war.

The 15th Battalion had seven officers commanding: 
Lt.-Col. A.J. Currie, 22 September 1914 – 28 June 1915
Lt.-Col. W.B. Marshall, DSO, 28 June 1915 – 19 May 1916
Lt.-Col. C.E. Bent, DSO, 20 May 1916 – 29 December 1917
Lt.-Col. J.W. Forbes, DSO, 29 December 1917 – 15 April 1918
Lt.-Col. C.E. Bent, CMG, DSO, 15 April 1918 – 10 August 1918
Lt.-Col. J.P. Girvan, DSO, MC, 10 August 1918 – 3 October 1918
Lt.-Col. C.E. Bent, CMG, DSO, 3 October 1918 – Demobilization

Perpetuations 
The 15th Battalion (48th Highlanders of Canada), CEF, is perpetuated by the 48th Highlanders of Canada.

Battle Honours 
The 15th Battalion was awarded the following battle honours:
YPRES, 1915, '17
GRAVENSTAFEL
St. Julien
FESTUBERT, 1915
MOUNT SORREL
SOMME, 1916
Pozières
Thiepval
Ancre Heights
ARRAS, 1917, '18
VIMY, 1917
Arleux
Scarpe, 1917, '18
HILL 70
Passchendaele
AMIENS
Drocourt-Quéant
HINDENBURG LINE
Canal du Nord
PURSUIT TO MONS
FRANCE AND FLANDERS, 1915–18

See also 

 List of infantry battalions in the Canadian Expeditionary Force

References

Sources

Canadian Expeditionary Force 1914–1919 by Col. G. W. L. Nicholson, CD, Queen's Printer, Ottawa, Ontario, 1962

015
Military units and formations of Ontario
Military units and formations of Quebec
48th Highlanders of Canada